Phyllium bonifacioi is a species of phasmatodea in the family Phylliidae (leaf insect). P. bonifacioi is found on the north of Luzon island, Philippines. This species was named after Andrés Bonifacio. P. bonifacioi feeds on guava leaves. The males are thinner than the female and have transparent wings, although the female has more leaf-like wings. They has short antennae. The colour is green with some brown spots. The length of P. bonifacioi is 1 cm (0.3 inches).

References

Phylliidae
Insects of the Philippines
Insects described in 2014